Ceratiola is a genus of flowering plants with a single species, Ceratiola ericoides, the sand heath, sandhill-rosemary or Florida-rosemary,  is a species of shrub usually included in the plant family Ericaceae, though treated by some botanists in the Empetraceae. It is the sole species in the genus Ceratiola.

It is native to subtropical scrub and dry sandy habitats in the coastal southeastern United States, in Alabama, Florida, Georgia, Mississippi and South Carolina. It commonly occurs together with sand pine and species of oak. Like sand pine, it is adapted to the harsh coastal environment where hot sun and fast draining white sandy soils are common. Cetatiola regenerate by seed after periodic forest fires.

Its habitat is important for the endangered Florida sand skink (Neoseps reynoldsi) in central Florida.

The name derives from the species' superficial similarity to the unrelated European shrub rosemary, familiar for its leaves used as a herb. Florida-rosemary is not edible.

Florida-rosemary can grow to about 1.5 to 8 feet tall. It flowers in spring, summer and fall, and grows in the maritime hammocks.

References

External links
Fact sheet on the species, from the Georgia Department of Natural Resources

Ericoideae
Flora of Alabama
Flora of Florida
Monotypic Ericaceae genera